Laguna Hedionda may refer to:
 Laguna Hedionda (Sud Lípez), a lake in the mountains of Potosí Department, Bolivia
 Laguna Hedionda (Nor Lípez), a saline lake in the mountains of Nor Lípez Province, Potosí Department, Bolivia